Perryville is an unincorporated community located at the intersection of Interstate 78 and Perryville Road within Union Township in Hunterdon County, New Jersey.

The Perryville Station, one of the New Jersey State Police Troop B road stations, is located here.

History
In 1806, the stage coach route, known as the New Jersey Turnpike, running between Easton, Pennsylvania and New Brunswick, New Jersey, was built through here. The village formed around the Perryville Tavern built in 1813 and named after Commodore Oliver Hazard Perry for his naval victory at the Battle of Lake Erie that year.

References

External links
 
 

Union Township, Hunterdon County, New Jersey
Unincorporated communities in Hunterdon County, New Jersey
Unincorporated communities in New Jersey